Fightmilk is an indie rock band from London, England. After releasing two EPs, the self-released The Curse of Fightmilk in 2016 and Pity Party on Fierce Panda in 2017, the band released their debut album Not With That Attitude with Reckless Yes in 2018. Their second album Contender, on the same label, was released in 2021. Their output has been compared to Superchunk, Weezer, Kirsty MacColl, and Diet Cig.

History
Fightmilk was formed in London in 2015 by Lily Rae (guitar and lead vocals), Alex Wisgard (guitar), Adam Wainwright (bass), and Nick Kiddle (drums).

The band experimented, often flippantly, with other names before finally settling on "Fightmilk". The name is a reference to the fictional, “alcoholic, dairy-based protein drink for bodyguards by bodyguards”, created in Always Sunny In Philadelphia.

After self-releasing their debut EP The Curse of Fightmilk in 2016 they caught the attention of longstanding London independent label Fierce Panda who released their second EP, Pity Party in 2017.

Their first LP Not With That Attitude, recorded at Dean Street Studios, was released on 31 October 2018 by Derby based record label Reckless Yes. They returned again to Dean Street for their second album, Contender, which was released 14 May 2021. Between albums original bassist Wainwright left, and was replaced by former Wolf Girl member Healey Becks.

Discography

Albums
Not With That Attitude - Reckless Yes, LP, CD, MP3 (2018)
Contender - Reckless Yes, LP, CD, MP3 (2021)

Extended plays
The Curse of Fightmilk - Self-released, MP3 (2016)
Pity Party - Fierce Panda, MP3 (2017)
The FME EP - Self-released, MP3, (2020)
Fightmilk & Cookies - Self-released, MP3 (2020)

Compilations
Both Types of Hayfever - Self-released, CD, MP3 (2018)

References

British indie pop groups
English indie rock groups
English pop punk groups
Musical groups from London
Musical groups established in 2015
Musical quartets
Fierce Panda Records artists
2015 establishments in England